Maralinga: Australia’s Nuclear Waste Cover-up  is a book by Alan Parkinson about the clean-up of the British atomic bomb test site at Maralinga in South Australia, published in 2007.

Overview
Parkinson, a nuclear engineer and former Government Representative to oversee the Maralinga Rehabilitation Project, explains that the clean-up of Maralinga in the late 1990s was compromised by cost-cutting and simply involved dumping hazardous radioactive debris in shallow holes in the ground. Parkinson states that "What was done at Maralinga was a cheap and nasty solution that wouldn't be adopted on white-fellas land."

Reviews

 Australian Book Review
 Medicine, Conflict and Survival

See also
Britain, Australia and the Bomb
Downwinders
List of books about nuclear issues
Maralinga
McClelland Royal Commission
Montebello Islands
Silent Storm (film)

References

External links
Maralinga 'clean up' exposed
Do atomic test victims deserve compensation?

2007 non-fiction books
2007 in the environment
Environmental non-fiction books
Australian non-fiction books
Books about nuclear issues
Books about indigenous rights
Nuclear technology in Australia
Waste management in Australia
Radioactive waste